Adin (Hebrew: עדין) /ˈɑːdɪn/, also spelled Aidin (Persian: آیدین) /ˈeɪdən'/, is a modern variation of Aidan and several Celtic language names.
Adin is a first name which means everlasting bliss but may also mean a leader or handsome. It is quite common in Bosnia and Herzegovina: Adin was the 4th most popular boys' name in Bosnia and Herzegovina in 2014.  Adin is most commonly a masculine name, although it is sometimes given to girls.

Notable people with the first name include:
 Adin Ballou (1803–1890), American cleric and activist
Adin Brown, American soccer player and coach
Adin Bukva, Swedish footballer playing in Italy
Adin B. Capron (1841–1911), American miller and politician
Adin Džafić (born 1989), Bosnian footballer
 Adin Falkoff (1921–2010), American engineer and computer scientist
 Adin Hill (born 1996), Canadian ice hockey goaltender
Adin P. Hobart (1822–1881), American politician in Wisconsin
 Adin Mulaosmanović (born 1977), Bosnian footballer
Adin Randall (1829–1868), American businessman
Adin Ross, American Twitch streamer
 Adin Steinsaltz (1937–2020), Israeli rabbi and scholar
Adin Talbar (1921–2013), German-born Israeli diplomat and athlete
Adin Thayer (1816–1890), American politician from New York
Adin Ballou Underwood (1828–1888), American Union Army general
 Adin Vrabac (born 1994), Bosnian basketball player

See also 

 Aidin (name)

References 

Masculine given names